Synema may refer to:
 Synema, a botanical genus name that is considered synonymous to Mercurialis
 Synema (spider), a genus in Thomisidae

See also
 Sinema (disambiguation)